Chooks-to-Go is a chain of stores owned by Bounty Agro Ventures, Inc. (BAVI), a privately owned company operating in the Philippines. It offers roast chicken and processed meats for off-premises consumption.

Chooks-to-Go currently has close to a thousand outlets. The majority are in suburban areas and small towns, enabling access to a larger part of the population. The product mix is adjusted to suit local preferences.

The company has 23 processing plants across the country, allowing logistical and processing flexibility to match daily orders. A cold chain system delivers fresh products every day. Food safety is constantly monitored, with HACCP compliance underway.

Chooks-to-Go is an official partner of the Gilas Pilipinas program for the Philippine men's basketball team since 2016.

History
Chooks-to-Go is a brand of Bounty Agro Ventures, Inc. (BAVI), a company established in 1997 which was originally engaged in selling raw poultry products. The influx of cheaper raw poultry goods from other Southeast Asian countries with the implementation of the ASEAN Free Trade Area in the late-1990s led to BAVI to set up Chooks-to-Go, a retail chain which sells roast chicken products.

Chooks-to-Go was launched by BAVI in 2008. Its name combines "chooks" (the Australian casual term for chicken) with "to-go" to indicate its take-out-only format. To differentiate its products from those of competitors, it is marketed as the only roast chicken that can be enjoyed without the use of sauce (masarap kahit walang sauce). This caters both to the Filipinos' love for family gatherings, and the growing market segment of busy consumers with limited time for food preparation.

Since its launch, sales have stabilized to near industry-level average volume per store. To reach out to more customers, the company opened more outlets. By the end of 2011, Chooks-to-Go had more stores than the next five most-numerous roast chicken chains combined. In 2012, it was recognized as the top chicken-focused restaurant chain in the country.

To keep up with the growth, the brand expanded its broiler and breeder operations. Currently, around 200,000 birds are processed daily, with about half of this set aside for Chooks-to-Go outlets. The company targets an annual production of around 100 million birds by the end of 2013.

In an awarding ceremony held  last December 11, 2013 entitled “Volume VIII Second Certificate Superbrands Accreditation and Awarding of Certificate", Chooks-to-Go was the singular roasted chicken brand selected to carry the Superbrands Awards Seal for 2013 to 2015.

Products

Chooks-to-Go offers oven-roasted chicken in sweet and pepper roast flavors. Fried Chooks is chicken that is fried after roasting, creating a deep flavoured taste. Other products are Juicy Liempo, Fried Chicken and Chix 22. Chilled products include Chicken Licken hotdogs, Chicken Nuggets, Spicy Necks and Bounty Fresh Valentino Chicken. Fresh Chicken, Chicken Cut-Ups and Marinado are available under the Chooksie's brand.

A full service outlet carries 11 SKUs, including chilled dressed chicken and marinated products.

Operations
Store personnel are trained and constantly evaluated to maintain high standards of operation and quality of service. Recent results from a UAI study by Consumer Vibe Asia (2012 Project Seneca) showed  a best-in-class satisfaction score of 7.5 out of 10, for Chooks-To-Go in the food services arena. To keep quality at the desired level, the brand established the BAVI Academy, which provides in-house training for outlet personnel, and other areas of operations.

Chooks-to-Go has a delivery service for certain areas for a minimal fixed delivery fee of PHP30. Customer Service Associates take telephone orders and relay these to hubs, with software automatically determining the best hub based on customer location.

For marketing, Chooks-to-Go periodically conducts promotions, which may be on a national or local level. Site selection guidelines are strictly observed, while pre-opening campaigns for new stores are held and in-store merchandising is standardized.

See also
 Chooks-to-Go Pilipinas
 Tacloban Fighting Warays

References

External links
 

Philippine brands
Restaurant chains in the Philippines
Brand name meats
Fast-food poultry restaurants
Fast-food chains of the Philippines
Restaurants established in 2008